Anketell may refer to:

People
Anchetil de Greye, Anglo-Norman knight
Anketell Henderson (1853–1922), Australian architect
Geoffrey Anketell Studdert Kennedy MC (1883–1929), Anglican priest and poet
Anketell Moutray Read VC (1884–1915), English recipient of the Victoria Cross

Other 
 Anketell, Western Australia, suburb of Perth, Western Australia
 Anketell Port in Western Australia, near Cape Lambert

Other forms and similar names 
Anquetil
Anctil